Lantern Queen is a sternwheel replica-paddle steamer passenger ship operating on the Susquehanna River out of Havre de Grace, Maryland.

History
The Lantern Queen was built in 1983 in La Crosse, Wisconsin, by the La Crosse Riverboat Co., Ltd. After her construction, she was operated as Far West—a dinner cruise vessel—on the Missouri River, hailing out of Yankton, South Dakota. From 1994 to 1996 the ship was operated in Florida as the Lantern Queen. In 1996, the vessel was purchased and restored by Jack Morey who operated her on the Susquehanna River until the spring of 2007. Later that year, the Lantern Queen was purchased by her current owner, River City Trading, LLC, of Havre de Grace, Maryland. Since 2008, Krazy George Henderson has worked as a deckhand on the Lantern Queen. She was pulled from service and retired in July 2014 after a U.S. Coast Guard inspection found extensive electrolytic pitting in her hull with the cost of repairs exceeding the vessel's worth.

References

External links

Lantern Queen official website
"Becky and Carroll Fitzgerald, Lantern Queen"

1983 ships
Buildings and structures in Havre de Grace, Maryland
Paddle steamers of the United States
Passenger ships of the United States
Ships built in Wisconsin
Susquehanna River
Tourist attractions in Harford County, Maryland
Transportation in Harford County, Maryland